The List of Manitou Springs Historic District includes 80 buildings and resources in the historic district of Manitou Springs, Colorado.

See also
 National Register of Historic Places listings in El Paso County, Colorado

Notes
 Victorian is Vernacular Victorian Frame

References

Colorado State Register of Historic Properties
Manitou Springs, Colorado
Colorado geography-related lists
Manitou Springs